The Copper Rock Championship is a tournament on the Epson Tour, the LPGA's developmental tour. It has been a part of the tour's schedule since 2020. It is held at Copper Rock Golf Course in Hurricane, Utah.

The 2020 tournament was cancelled due to the COVID-19 pandemic.

Winners

References

External links

Coverage on Epson Tour website

Symetra Tour events
Golf in Utah
Recurring sporting events established in 2020
2020 establishments in Utah